Bullseye Mountain is a rounded, mainly ice-covered mountain rising above Peletier Plateau  northwest of Mount Ropar, in the Queen Elizabeth Range. The name given by the Advisory Committee on Antarctic Names is descriptive of the semicircular bands of snow on the south side of the mountain.

References 

Mountains of the Ross Dependency
Shackleton Coast